Girls in Distress is a 1939 French drama film directed by G. W. Pabst and starring Marcelle Chantal, Micheline Presle and André Lugue.

The film's sets were designed by the art director Andrej Andrejew. It was shot at the Joinville Studios in Paris.

Cast
 Marcelle Chantal as Marthe Presle
 Micheline Presle as Jacqueline Presle
 André Luguet as Maître Jacques Presle
 Jean Aquistapace as Ternier, le ministre de la justice (as Aquistapace)
 Pierre Bertin as Legris, le secrétaire de Me Presle
 Louise Carletti as Marguerite 'Margot' Montbleu
 Jacqueline Delubac as Mme Montbleu, nom de scène: Pola D'Ivry
 Arthur Devère as Le père d'Alice
Genevieve Dorlane as Mme Tarrand
 Paulette Élambert as Denise Tarrand
 Michel François as Michel Mortier
 René Génin as Le concierge du ministère
 Gaston Jacquet as Le père d'Amélie
 Georges Jamin as Le beauaspère d'Amélie
 Margo Lion as La mère de Thérèse
 Marcel Lupovici as Morel
 Mlle Malakowsky as Amélie
 Robert Manuel as Robert
 Milly Mathis as La mère d'Alice
 Marthe Mellot as Mademoiselle Jeanne
 Marguerite Moreno as Madame Vuilliard
 Robert Pizani as Monsieur Tarrand
 Christiane Ribes as La mère d'Amélie
 Gabrielle Robinne as Le mère d'Yvette
 Barbara Shaw as La belleasmère d'Amélie
 Sinoël as Le concierge du théâtre
Yvonne Yma as L'habilleuse de Pola

Notable uncredited cast are:

 Madeleine Lebeau as a Student

References

Bibliography
 Rentschler, Eric. The Films of G.W. Pabst: An Extraterritorial Cinema. Rutgers University Press, 1990.

External links

1939 films
French drama films
1930s French-language films
1939 drama films
French black-and-white films
Films directed by G. W. Pabst
Films shot at Joinville Studios
1930s French films